Naamah ( – Naʿămā) is an individual mentioned in the Hebrew Bible, in . A descendant of Cain, she was the only mentioned daughter of Lamech and Zillah and their youngest mentioned child; her brother was Tubal-cain, while Jabal and Jubal were her half-brothers, sons of Lamech's other wife Adah.

Theories 
Gordon Wenham notes that the reason "she should be picked out for special mention remains obscure", while R. R. Wilson suggests that the narrator simply wished to offer a balanced genealogy by noting that both of Lamech's wives had two children.

The early Jewish midrash Genesis Rabba (23.3) identifies this Naamah (the daughter of Lamech and sister of Tubal-cain) as the wife of Noah (see Rashi's commentary on Genesis 4:22), while some Jewish traditions associate her with singing.

The Naamah mentioned in the Bible is a Cainite, a descendant in the lineage of Cain. However, a Sethite Naamah is named as the wife of Noah, and a daughter of Enoch, Noah's great-grandfather, in a medieval midrash.

The 17th-century theologian John Gill mentioned a theory which identified Naamah instead with the name of the wife of Ham, son of Noah, who he believed may have become confused with Noah's wife. See Wives aboard the Ark.

Family tree

References

External links

Book of Genesis people
Bereshit (parashah)
Women in the Hebrew Bible